It Must Be Somewhere is the fourth studio album by the Geneva-based punk rock band Hateful Monday, released on November 11, 2013 on CD through Nyoncore and Torch of Hope Records in Japan. The album contains a cover of "Võõras sõda" by J.M.K.E., performed entirely in Estonian.

Track listing

Personnel 
Hateful Monday
Reverend Seb – lead vocals, bass guitar
Igor Gonzola – drums
Charly Cougar – guitar, backing vocals
M. Fallan – guitar, backing vocals

Artwork
Javier / Hardcore Solution Graphix - Design

Production
M. Fallan – producer
Serge Morattel – mastering, mixing

References 

Hateful Monday albums
2013 albums